"I Won't Back Down" is a song by American rock musician Tom Petty. It was released in April 1989 as the lead single from his first solo album, Full Moon Fever. The song was co-written by Petty and Jeff Lynne, also his writing partner for the album. It reached number 12 on the Billboard Hot 100 and topped the Album Rock Tracks chart for five weeks, starting the album's road to multi-platinum status.

Background and writing
Petty recalled the recording of this song to Mojo magazine: "At the session George Harrison sang and played the guitar. I had a terrible cold that day, and George went to the store and bought a ginger root, boiled it and had me stick my head in the pot to get the ginger steam to open up my sinuses, and then I ran in and did the take."

Critical reception
Members of the Scottish pop band Win reviewed the song for the May 13, 1989 issue of British music newspaper Record Mirror. Emmanuel Shoniwa and Davy Henderson both found the title track dated. Shoniwa said: "He's definitely got old before his time, surrounding himself with his heroes" and Henderson echoed: "He seems to have willed himself into becoming a 40-years-old has-been".
Jerry Smith, reviewer of British music newspaper Music Week, called this track "extremely catchy, chugging rocker" and expressed an opinion that Jeff Lynne's production "is sure to leave its mark in the build up to the release of his forthcoming LP". Music & Media found it "rootsy, very American rock with country overtones. Simple and charming with a nostalgic, early 70s production."

Content
A message of defiance against unnamed forces of difficulty and possibly oppression, the lyric is set against a mid-tempo beat:

Due to its themes, the song was played often on American radio following the September 11 attacks.  Petty and the Heartbreakers played a quiet but resolute version of the song at the America: A Tribute to Heroes telethon following the 2001 attacks.

In the 2007 documentary Runnin' Down a Dream, Petty said that he felt some initial hesitation about releasing the song, given its clear and unabashed message.

Agreement with Sam Smith

In January 2015, it was revealed that an agreement had been reached whereby Petty and Jeff Lynne would be credited as co-writers of Sam Smith's song "Stay with Me" and receive 12.5% of its royalties. Petty's publishing company had contacted Smith's publisher after noticing a likeness between "Stay with Me" and "I Won't Back Down". Petty clarified that he did not believe Smith plagiarized him, saying "All my years of songwriting have shown me these things can happen. Most times you catch it before it gets out the studio door but in this case it got by. Sam's people were very understanding of our predicament and we easily came to an agreement". Smith claimed not to have heard "I Won't Back Down" before writing "Stay with Me", but acknowledged the similarity after listening to the song, calling it "a complete coincidence". Petty and Lynne were not eligible for a Grammy Award ("Stay with Me" was nominated for three awards at the 57th annual ceremony, winning two of them) as the Recording Academy considered "Stay with Me" to have been interpolated from "I Won't Back Down" by Smith, James Napier, and William Phillips, the writers of "Stay with Me"; Petty and Lynne were instead given certificates to honor their participation in the work, as is usual for writers of sampled or interpolated work.

Personnel
Tom Petty – lead vocals and backing vocals, acoustic guitar
Mike Campbell – electric guitar
George Harrison – acoustic guitar and backing vocals
Jeff Lynne – bass, synthesizer and backing vocals
Howie Epstein – backing vocals
Phil Jones – drums and drum machine

Harrison and Lynne also appear in the music video with Harrison's former Beatles bandmate, Ringo Starr, playing drums even though Starr did not play on the recording.

Charts

Weekly charts

Year-end charts

Certifications

Use in political campaigns
George W. Bush used "I Won't Back Down" at campaign events during the 2000 presidential campaign but was compelled to stop using the song after receiving a cease and desist letter from Petty's publisher. Petty then went on to perform the song at Al Gore's home after Gore conceded the election to President Bush. Jim Webb used the song for his successful bid for one of Virginia's U.S. Senate seats in 2006, as did Hillary Clinton during the 2008 Democratic presidential primary campaign.  The song was also used at campaign events for Congressman Ron Paul of Texas during the 2008 Republican presidential primary campaign, as well as for events for his Campaign for Liberty. The song was also played at an event for Republican Connecticut gubernatorial nominee, Tom Foley. The song was also played at the 2012 Democratic National Convention after a speech delivered by President Bill Clinton, in which President Barack Obama came out on stage to salute him.

In June 2020, Petty's family issued a cease and desist letter to President Donald Trump's campaign for its use of "I Won't Back Down" at Trump's rally in Tulsa on June 20, 2020. The letter stated: "Trump was in no way authorized to use this song to further a campaign that leaves too many Americans and common sense behind. Both the late Tom Petty and his family firmly stand against racism and discrimination of any kind. Tom Petty would never want a song of his used for a campaign of hate. He liked to bring people together".

In November 2020, President-elect Joe Biden and Vice President-Elect Kamala Harris played "I Won't Back Down" at their victory speech in Wilmington, Delaware.  Petty's family wrote on Instagram that they were "touched to see Tom included on such an important night in America."

Use in sports campaigns

Playing the song has become a tradition at Florida Gators football games at the University of Florida in Gainesville, Petty's hometown. Petty died unexpectedly on October 2, 2017, and at the next home football game the following Saturday, the "I Won't Back Down" was played between the third and fourth quarters immediately after the traditional university song "We Are the Boys from Old Florida". It has been played at that time at every subsequent Gator home game, with fans singing along and holding aloft cell phones to fill the stadium with lights.
The San Francisco Giants used the song for Jeff Brantley's walk-on in the 1989 season; that year the Giants went to the World Series to face the Oakland Athletics, where game three was interrupted by a major earthquake and postponed for two weeks. 
The Ottawa Senators used the song as a campaign anthem in December 1990 at their presentation to be awarded an NHL franchise at the Breakers Hotel in Palm Beach, Florida. The unlikely bid received unanimous support from the NHL and the franchise was awarded on December 6, 1990.
The song was used as the walkout song for the Australian Rugby League club the Melbourne Storm from 1999 to 2007. 
The TCU Horned Frogs used the song as their slogan during the 2009 season, and incorporated into their merchandise during the year.
The Johnny Cash cover of the song from the album American III: Solitary Man was used for a Rogers Sportsnet advertising campaign for the 2010-2011 NHL season.
UFC fighter Chris Weidman used the song for his walkout music throughout his career. Most notably at UFC 162 when he fought Middleweight Champion Anderson Silva. Going into the fight as the underdog, Weidman upset the Champion and was the first person to beat Silva in almost 7 years. Because of the fitting lyrics, this has often been regarded as one of the best UFC walkouts of all time.

All appearances
Full Moon Fever (1989)
Greatest Hits (1993)
Playback (1995)
Anthology: Through the Years (2000)
America: A Tribute to Heroes (2001)
The Live Anthology (2009)
Mojo Tour 2010 (2010) – live version
The song was also released as downloadable content for Rock Band 2.

Notable cover versions
Johnny Cash – American III: Solitary Man (2000) (Petty contributed vocals and guitar to Cash's recording.)
Sam Elliot – Barnyard (played during three scenes by Elliot's character, Ben, such as when he plays the song's tune on his guitar while fighting the coyotes and in the film's climax in which his adopted son, Otis, fights the coyotes as well to avenge their murder of his father) This cover is primarily based on Cash's. (2006)
Benjamin Francis Leftwich – covered the song for Grey's Anatomy (season 9, episode 3). (2012)
Kris Kristofferson – covered for the soundtrack for History Channel's Texas Rising. (2015)
Jason Aldean – Saturday Night Live (2017), as a tribute to the victims of the 2017 Las Vegas shooting and Petty, who died a day after the incident.
Hybrid – closing track on their 2018 album Light of the Fearless.
Joshua Radin – covered on his 2019 album Here, Right Now.

 Everclear also covered this song.

References

External links
 NPR testimonials about impact of song on peoples' lives

1989 songs
1989 singles
Tom Petty songs
Protest songs
Song recordings produced by Jeff Lynne
Songs written by Jeff Lynne
Songs written by Tom Petty
MCA Records singles